In enzymology, a phosphatidylinositol alpha-mannosyltransferase is an enzyme that catalyzes the chemical reaction in which at least one alpha-D-mannose residues are transferred from GDP-mannose to positions 6, 2 and others in 1-phosphatidyl-myo-inositol.

This enzyme belongs to the family of glycosyltransferases, specifically the hexosyltransferases.  The systematic name of this enzyme class is GDP-mannose:1-phosphatidyl-1D-myo-inositol alpha-D-mannosyltransferase. Other names in common use include GDP mannose-phosphatidyl-myo-inositol alpha-mannosyltransferase, GDPmannose:1-phosphatidyl-myo-inositol alpha-D-mannosyltransferase, guanosine diphosphomannose-phosphatidyl-inositol, alpha-mannosyltransferase, and phosphatidyl-myo-inositol alpha-mannosyltransferase.

References

 

EC 2.4.1
Enzymes of unknown structure